For Those Who Stay is the third studio album by Canadian duo PS I Love You. It was released in July 2014 under Paper Bag Records.

Track list

References

2014 albums
Paper Bag Records albums